Nijverdal West was a temporary railway station located in Nijverdal, the Netherlands. The station was located on the Zwolle–Almelo railway and opened on 14 December 2009. It closed on 3 March 2013. The services were operated by Nederlandse Spoorwegen.

To improve road and rail routes between Almelo and Zwolle there were many works along the line. As a result of this, temporary station Nijverdal West was opened in December 2009. During its operational period, there was no direct service between Zwolle and Almelo. The services operated as Zwolle - Nijverdal West and Nijverdal - Almelo - Enschede, with a shuttle bus service between Nijverdal West and Nijverdal.

Train service
The following services called at Nijverdal West:
2× per hour local service (stoptrein) Zwolle - Nijverdal West

References

Railway stations in Overijssel
Railway stations opened in 2009
Hellendoorn